A matha is a monastic and similar religious establishment in Hinduism and Jainism.

Matha may also refer to:

Matha (given name), a variant of the name Maitiú, an Irish form of Matthew.
Matha, Charente-Maritime, a commune in France
Matha Strait, Antarctica
Matha (film), a 2012 Sri Lankan film
 Armand Matha (1861–1930), French anarchist